Masar Ömer (born 12 June 1993) is a Finnish professional footballer who plays for FC Honka, as a striker. He is of Turkish descent.

References

1993 births
Living people
Finnish footballers
Etelä-Espoon Pallo players
PK-35 Vantaa (men) players
FC Honka players
Kakkonen players
Ykkönen players
Veikkausliiga players
Association football forwards
Finnish people of Turkish descent